José Ramiro Funes Mori (born 5 March 1991) is an Argentine professional footballer who plays as a defender for Liga MX club Cruz Azul. He plays primarily as a centre-back but can also operate as a left-back and defensive midfielder.

Early life
Funes Mori was born in Mendoza. He emigrated with his family from Argentina to the United States in 2001. His father, Miguel, played professional football in Argentina with clubs such as Independiente Rivadavia and Club Atlético Argentino in the 1980s. In 2008, Funes Mori joined the FC Dallas youth team after his twin brother won the Sueño MLS talent competition, but spent less than a year playing for the side before moving back to Argentina.

Club career

River Plate
Funes Mori joined River Plate as a youth player, progressing to the senior team in 2011. He is considered a legend of the club because he won 6 professional titles (four of them international) including the 2015 Copa Libertadores. He made his debut for the Argentina national team whilst playing for River Plate. Funes Mori is remembered not only for his performances and titles, but also for scoring very important goals such as the third goal in the Copa Libertadores final and an iconic goal against Boca Juniors. He made a total of 108 appearances for River Plate across five seasons, scoring ten goals.

Everton
On 1 September 2015, Funes Mori joined Premier League club Everton for a fee of £9.5 million. He made his debut 11 days later, coming on as a substitute, in a 3–1 home win against Chelsea. He scored his first goal for Everton in a 3–3 draw with Bournemouth in November 2015. In his first season with the club, he received significant playing time at centre back due to injuries and lack of form for the expected starting pair of Phil Jagielka and John Stones. In April 2016, Funes Mori was sent off for a tackle on Divock Origi in a 4–0 loss to Liverpool, leading to a three-match suspension. He scored five goals across all competitions in his first season with the club.

Funes Mori was out for the remainder of the 2016–17 season after suffering a torn meniscus while on international duty with Argentina in March 2017. In the summer of 2017, Funes Mori had undergone a second operation on his knee injury in Barcelona and was looking at between six and nine months on the sidelines.

Villarreal
On 21 June 2018, Funes Mori joined La Liga club Villarreal for an undisclosed fee.

International career
Funes Mori made his international debut for Argentina in an international friendly against El Salvador in March 2015.

He was selected for his national squad at the Copa América Centenario and was part of the Argentine side that reached the final. The defender played in the final where Chile won 4–2 on penalties after the match finished in a goalless draw. He was not selected as one of the first four penalty takers. Funes Mori scored his first international goal on 6 October 2016 in a 2–2 draw against Peru in a match which he also conceded a late penalty.

In May 2018, he was named in Argentina's preliminary 35-man squad for the 2018 World Cup in Russia, but did not make the final 23.

Personal life
Funes Mori is married to Rocío, the sister of former FC Dallas midfielder Mauro Díaz. His twin brother, Rogelio, is also a footballer and plays for Liga MX club Monterrey and the Mexico national team as a striker.

Career statistics

Club

International

As of match played 16 November 2018
Argentina score listed first, score column indicates score after each Funes Mori goal.

Honours
River Plate
Argentina Primera Division: 2014
Copa Campeonato: 2013–14
Copa Sudamericana: 2014
Recopa Sudamericana: 2015
Copa Libertadores: 2015
Suruga Bank Championship: 2015
Primera B Nacional: 2011–12
Villarreal
 UEFA Europa League: 2020–21

Notes

References

External links

1991 births
Living people
Argentine twins
Twin sportspeople
Sportspeople from Mendoza Province
Soccer players from Texas
Argentine footballers
Association football defenders
Club Atlético River Plate footballers
Everton F.C. players
Villarreal CF players
Al Nassr FC players
Argentine Primera División players
Primera Nacional players
Premier League players
La Liga players
Saudi Professional League players
Copa Libertadores-winning players
UEFA Europa League winning players
Argentina international footballers
Copa América Centenario players
2019 Copa América players
Argentine expatriate footballers
Argentine expatriate sportspeople in England
Argentine expatriate sportspeople in Spain
Argentine expatriate sportspeople in Saudi Arabia
Expatriate footballers in England
Expatriate footballers in Spain
Expatriate footballers in Saudi Arabia
Identical twins